Bilad Sayt is a mountain village in Oman.

The village is located on the NE slope of the Al Hajar Mountains near the highest peak in the Sultanate of Oman, Jebel Shams. Bilad Sayt can be reached through Wadi Al Sahtan and Wadi Bani Awf from NE or via Al Hamra from the SW and is only accessible by 4-wheel-drive vehicles.

References

Populated places in Oman